Stefan M. Vodenicharov (1 September 1944 – 8 June 2020) was president of the Bulgarian Academy of Sciences and Minister of Education, Youth and Science.

Education and career
Vodenicharov was born 1 September 1944 in Sofia. He graduated from the Technical University, Sofia with a degree in metal technology, and then got his Ph.D. in 1974. In 1991 Vodenicharov became a professor and in 2004 became corresponding member of the Bulgarian Academy of Sciences (BAS). On 3 December 2012, following the death of Stefan Dodunekov, Vodenicharov was elected as BAS president. He also served as deputy director and head of the Academician Angel Balevski Institute of Metal Science Equipment and Technologies with Center for Hydro and Aerodynamics at BAS and a member of managing board of the Bulgarian Industrial Association. As a president of the BAS, Vodenicharov had participated in a forum on innovation meeting, held at BAS between Bulgaria and Israel. He became Minister of Education, Youth and Science in the cabinet of Boyko Borisov on 6 February 2013, succeeding Sergei Ignatov. The government fell shortly afterwards on 20 February.

He died on 8 June 2020.

References

External links

1944 births
2020 deaths
Government ministers of Bulgaria
Members of the Bulgarian Academy of Sciences
People from Sofia
Technical University, Sofia alumni
21st-century Bulgarian politicians